Lillo may refer to:

 Lillo Baby, a Brazilian baby accessory maker
 Lillo & Greg, an Italian comedy duo

Places 
 Lillo, Antwerp, a former town in Belgium, disappeared due to the expansion of the Port of Antwerp; what remains is now part of Berendrecht-Zandvliet-Lillo
 Lillo, Spain

People 
People with the surname Lillo include:

 Alejandra Lillo (born 1972), American designer
 Baldomero Lillo (1867–1923), Chilean naturalist author
 Carlos Lillo (1915–?), Chilean boxer
 George Lillo (1693–1739), British playwright and tragedian
 Giuseppe Lillo (1814–1863), Italian composer
 Gustavo Lillo (born 1973), retired Argentine professional footballer
 Juan Manuel Lillo (born 1965), Spanish football manager
 Lauren Lillo (born 1984), American Female Fitness Competitor
 Lillo (footballer) (born 1989), Spanish footballer
 Luisa Pastor Lillo (1948–2018), Spanish politician
 Miguel Lillo (1862–1931), Argentine naturalist
 Samuel Lillo (1870–1958), Chilean writer

People with the given name Lillo include:

 Lillo Brancato, Jr. (born 1976), American actor

 Lillo Thomas (born 1961), American former Olympic-qualifying athlete and recording artist

  [Lillo Way ]]  (born 1945), American poet, former modern dancer and choreographer www.lilloway.com